The following is a list of radio stations formerly owned by NBC via parent company RCA from 1926 until 1989. NBC formerly operated two radio networks in the United States: the NBC Radio Network from 1926 until 1987 (known as the NBC Red Network from 1926 to 1942) and the NBC Blue Network from 1926 until 1943 (known as the Blue Network from 1942 to 1945 and the American Broadcasting Company from 1945 onward).

Stations are arranged in alphabetical order by state and city of license. 

 (**) indicates a station that was built and signed-on by RCA, either before or after NBC's formation.

NBC Radio Network stations

NBC Blue Network stations

Divestitures 
General Electric purchased NBC's parent company, RCA, in early 1986. With the purchase, GE announced intentions to sell off the entirety of NBC's radio group and RCA's non-broadcast holdings, the latter spun off to Bertelsmann and Thomson SA. After a planned sale of the entire radio unit to Westinghouse Broadcasting in early 1987 fell through, Westwood One acquired the programming assets of the NBC Radio Network—including NBC's radio news service, The Source and Talknet—in a $50 million deal on July 20, 1987.

The NBC-owned radio stations were sold to various buyers. WMAQ was acquired by Westinghouse in November 1987. WNBC and WYNY in New York City, WKQX in Chicago, WJIB in Boston and KYUU in San Francisco were sold to Emmis Communications for a combined $121.5 million (equivalent to $ in ) on February 18, 1988. (As part of the deal, Emmis sold the licenses of their existing New York AM/FM combination, WFAN and WQHT, and transferred the intellectual properties of both stations onto WNBC and WYNY, respectively.) WKYS was sold to minority-controlled Albimar Communications on April 7, 1988, for $46.75 million (equivalent to $ in ). KNBR was the final radio property sold, with Susquehanna Radio Corporation purchasing it for $20 million (equivalent to $ in ) in March 1989.

Notes

References 

NBC,Former